

Events
 January 14 – Opening night gala concert at the Philharmonie de Paris
 January 15 – The Alabama Symphony Orchestra announces the appointment of Carlos Izcaray as its next music director, as of September 2015.
 January 19 – The Basel Sinfonietta announces the appointment of Baldur Brönnimann as its first-ever principal conductor, effective with the 2016–2017 season.
 January 23
 The Konzert Theater Bern announces the appointment of Kevin John Edusei as its next chief conductor, effective with the 2015–2016 season.
 The city of Brandenburg an der Havel announces the appointment of Peter Gülke as the next chief conductor of the Brandenburger Theater and of the Brandenburger Symphoniker, effective with the 2015–2016 season.
 January 28
 The Orchestre de la Suisse Romande announces the appointment of Jonathan Nott as its 10th music director and artistic director, effective January 2017.
 The Kennedy Center for the Performing Arts announces the appointment of Mason Bates as its first-ever composer-in-residence, effective with the 2015–2016 season, for a term of three years.
 February 6:
 The Dusseldorf Symphony Orchestra (Düsseldorfer Symphoniker) announces the appointment of Ádám Fischer as its next principal conductor.
 The New York Philharmonic announces that Alan Gilbert is to conclude his tenure as the orchestra's music director after the 2016–2017 season.
 February 8 – First US performance of the Felix Mendelssohn edition (1841, Leipzig) of the JS Bach St Matthew Passion
 February 12
 Arts Council England announces its intention to remove English National Opera from its national portfolio of regularly funded UK arts organisations, and to change its funding arrangement from a three-year plan to a two-year plan, with stipulations that ENO reform its current business model.
 The Milwaukee Symphony Orchestra announces that Edo de Waart is to conclude his tenure as the orchestra's music director after the 2016–2017 season.
 February 18 – The National Symphony Orchestra and the John F. Kennedy Center for the Performing Arts announce that Christoph Eschenbach is to conclude his music directorship of both organisations after the 2016–2017 season.
 February 22 – The Bruckner Orchestra Linz and Linz Opera announce the appointment of Markus Poschner as their next chief conductor, effective in 2017.
 February 26 – The BBC Philharmonic announces the appointment of Mark Simpson as its next Composer-in-Association, effective September 2015.
 February 27:
 The Auckland Philharmonia Orchestra announces the appointment of Giordano Bellincampi as its next music director, effective in 2016, with an initial contract of three years.
 The Memphis Symphony Orchestra announces the scheduled conclusion of the tenure of Mei-Ann Chen as its music director, after the end of the 2015–2016 season.
 The Cincinnati May Festival announces that James Conlon is to stand down as its music director after the 2016 Festival, and subsequently to take the title of music director laureate.
 March 3 – The London Symphony Orchestra announces the appointment of Sir Simon Rattle as its next music director, effective September 2017, with an initial contract of five years.
 March 4 – The New York Philharmonic announces that David Geffen is to donate $100M USD to the orchestra for the renovation of Avery Fisher Hall, with the proviso that the hall be renamed "David Geffen Hall" and bear the new name in perpetuity.
 March 6 – Palm Beach Opera announces the appointment of David Stern as its next music director, effective June 1, 2015.
 March 9
 English National Opera announces the appointment of Cressida Pollock, a management consultant, as its interim CEO.
 The Palau de les Arts Reina Sofia announces the appointments of Roberto Abbado and Fabio Biondi as its next joint music directors, and of Ramón Tebar as its next principal guest conductor.
 March 11
 The BBC Scottish Symphony Orchestra announces the appointment of Thomas Dausgaard as its 11th chief conductor, effective with the 2016–2017 season.
 Simon Halsey is announced as the recipient of the Queen's Medal for Music 2014.
 March 16 – Alan Buribayev becomes principal conductor of the Astana Opera House, Kazakhstan.
 March 18 – The Birmingham Conservatoire announces the appointment of Julian Lloyd Webber as its next Principal, after the scheduled retirement of David Saint, the current Principal, in June 2015.
 March 19 – The Montreal Symphony Orchestra announces a new five-year recording contract with Decca Records.
 April 3
 The Monte-Carlo Philharmonic Orchestra announces the appointment of Kazuki Yamada as its next principal conductor and artistic director, effective September 2016, with an initial contract of three years.
 The Boston Symphony Orchestra announces a new recording partnership with Deutsche Grammophon that focuses on the music of Dmitri Shostakovich.
 April 9 – The Adelaide Symphony Orchestra announces the appointment of Nicholas Carter as its next chief conductor, with an initial contract of two years.
 April 14 – The Glenn Gould Foundation announces its selection of Philip Glass as the Eleventh Glenn Gould Prize Laureate.
 April 20 – The Japan Philharmonic Orchestra announces the appointment of Pietari Inkinen as its next chief conductor, effective September 2016, with an initial contract of three seasons.
 April 21 – Scottish Opera announces the appointment of Stuart Stratford as its next music director, effective June 1, 2015.
 April 24 – The Royal Liverpool Philharmonic announces the appointment of Sir Andrew Davis as its new Conductor Emeritus.
 April 28 – The Zurich Chamber Orchestra announces the appointment of Daniel Hope as its next music director, effective in 2016.
 May 1 – The 2015 Malko Competition for conductors announces Tung-Chieh Chuang as this year's winner.
 May 8 – Symphony Number One gives its debut concert at the Baltimore War Memorial.
 May 12 – The BBC National Orchestra of Wales announces the appointment of Huw Watkins as its next Composer-in-Association, for the period 2015–2018.
 May 26 – The BBC announces the appointment of David Pickard as the next Director of the BBC Proms.
 June 3 – The Orchester Musikkollegium Winterthur announces the appointment of Thomas Zehetmair as its next principal conductor, effective September 2016, with an initial contract of three seasons.
 June 9 – The RAI National Symphony Orchestra announces the appointment of James Conlon as its next principal conductor, effective with the 2016–2017 season.
 June 10 – The Regina Symphony Orchestra announces the appointment of Gordon Gerrard as its next music director, effective with the 2016–2017 season.
 June 11 – The Orchestre de Paris announces the appointment of Daniel Harding as its 9th principal conductor, effective September 2016.
 June 12 – Queen's Birthday Honours 2015
 James MacMillan and Karl Jenkins are each made Knight Bachelor.
 Sir Neville Marriner is made a Companion of Honour.
 Simon Halsey and Mark-Anthony Turnage are each made a Commander of the Order of the British Empire.
 June 17 – The Residentie Orchestra announces the appointment of Nicholas Collon as its co-principal conductor, effective August 1, 2016, for a minimum term of three years.
 June 19 – Jongmin Park wins the Song Prize in the 2015 Cardiff Singer of the World competition.
 June 21
 Nadine Koutcher wins the final, Main Prize of the 2015 Cardiff Singer of the World competition.
 Amartuvshin Enkhbat is the winner of the Audience Prize of the 2015 Cardiff Singer of the World competition.
 June 22 – The Berlin Philharmonic announces its election of Kirill Petrenko as its next chief conductor.
 June 29
 The New Zealand Symphony Orchestra announces the appointment of Edo de Waart as its next music director, effective in 2016.
 The Bayreuth Festival announces the appointment of Christian Thielemann as its music director.
 The European Union Youth Orchestra announces the appointments of Vasily Petrenko as its next chief conductor effective September 2015, and of Bernard Haitink as its conductor laureate with immediate effect.
 June 30 – The Sinfonieorchester Basel announces the appointment of Ivor Bolton as its next chief conductor, as of the 2016–2017 season, with an initial contract of four years.
 July 2 – The Beethoven Orchester Bonn announces the appointment of Christof Perick as its interim Generalmusikdirektor for the 2016–2017 season.
 July 3 – The Deutsches Nationaltheater and Staatskapelle Weimar announce the appointment of Kirill Karabits as its next Generalmusikdirector (GMD) and chief conductor, effective with the 2016–2017 season, with an initial contract of three years. 
 July 10 – English National Opera announces the departure of John Berry as artistic director.
 August 6 – The Ames Stradivarius violin, stolen from Roman Totenberg in 1980, is returned to Totenberg's family in New York City.
 August 7 – The Spartanburg Philharmonic Orchestra announces that Sarah Ioannides is to conclude her tenure with the orchestra after the 2016–2017 season.
 August 13
 The Lucerne Festival announces the appointment of Riccardo Chailly as the next music director of the Lucerne Festival Orchestra, effective with the 2016 Lucerne Festival, with an initial contract of five years.
 The Metropolitan Opera announces that Mary Jo Heath is to be the new radio host for the Metropolitan Opera Saturday radio broadcasts, effective in September 2015.
 August 17 – The Lahti Symphony Orchestra announces the appointment of Dima Slobodeniouk as its next principal conductor, effective in the autumn of 2016, with an initial contract of three seasons.
 August 24 – The Theater Bonn announces the appointment of Jacques Lacombe as the new chief conductor of Bonn Opera, effective with the 2016–2017 season, with an initial contract of two years.
 September 2 – La Monnaie announces the appointment of Alain Altinoglu as its next music director, effective January 2016.
 September 3 – The Leipzig Gewandhaus Orchestra announces that Riccardo Chailly is to conclude his tenure as Gewandhauskapellmeister in June 2016, four years ahead of their most recent contract agreement.
 September 4
 At a conference of the International Musicological Society in Saint Petersburg, Russia, Natalya Braginskaya announced the re-discovery of an early orchestral work of Igor Stravinsky, Pogrebal'naya Pesnya (Funeral Song), which had gone missing since its only performance in January 1909.
 The Lucerne Festival announces the appointments of Wolfgang Rihm as the new director of the Lucerne Festival Academy, and of Matthias Pintscher as principal conductor of the Lucerne Festival Academy.
 September 7 – The Bamberg Symphony announces the appointment of Jakub Hrůša as its next chief conductor, as of the 2016–2017 season, with an initial contract of five seasons.
 September 9 – The Leipzig Gewandhaus Orchestra announces the appointment of Andris Nelsons as its 21st Gewandhauskapellmeister, effective with the 2017–2018 season, with an initial contract of five seasons.
 September 11:
 Arvo Pärt's 80th birthday is celebrated worldwide.
 The Zuger Sinfonietta announces the appointment of Daniel Huppert as its next chief conductor, effective with the 2016–2017 season.
 September 13 – The Chineke! Orchestra, the first black and minority ethnic orchestra in Europe, gives its ensemble debut concert at the Queen Elizabeth Hall, London.
 September 15
 The Liechtenstein Symphony Orchestra announces the appointment of Stefan Sanderling as its next chief conductor, effective with the 2016–2017 season.
 The Colorado Symphony Orchestra announces that Andrew Litton is to stand down from his post as the orchestra's music director after the 2015–2016 season, and to become the orchestra's artistic advisor and principal guest conductor through the 2017–2018 season.
 September 16 – The Cabrillo Festival of Contemporary Music announces that Marin Alsop is to conclude her tenure as its director in August 2016.
 September 18 – The Berlin Radio Symphony Orchestra announces the appointment of Vladimir Jurowski as its next chief conductor.
 September 21:
 English National Opera formalises the full appointments of Harry Brünjes as chairman, with immediate effect, and of Cressida Pollock as chief executive officer, for an additional three years.
 The Munich Chamber Orchestra announces the appointment of Clemens Schuldt as its next principal conductor, effective with the 2016–2017 season, with an initial contract of three years.
 The Dalasinfoniettan announces the appointment of Daniel Blendulf as its next chief conductor, with immediate effect, with an initial contract of three years.
 September 22 – San Francisco Opera announces the appointment of Matthew Shivlock as its 7th general director, effective July 2016.
 September 23 – Welsh National Opera announces the appointments of Tomáš Hanus as its next music director as of the 2016–2017 season, and of Carlo Rizzi as its conductor laureate with immediate effect.
 September 27 – The world premiere of the eight-hour version of Sleep, composed by Max Richter in collaboration with David Eagleman, occurred at the Wellcome Collection and was broadcast live on BBC Radio 3, the single longest musical composition ever broadcast live in the history of the BBC.
 October 1:
 Gotham Chamber Opera announces immediate cessation of operations, because of a fiscal deficit that the company judged itself unable to redeem.
 The Memphis Symphony Orchestra announces the appointment of Robert Moody as its new principal conductor, effective with the 2016–2017 season, with an initial contract of two years.
 PIAS officially takes full control of the music assets of harmonia mundi.
 October 5 – Camerata Notturna announces the appointment of Gemma New as its next principal conductor.
 October 6 – The Iceland Symphony Orchestra announces the appointment of Yan Pascal Tortelier as its next chief conductor, effective with the 2016–2017 season, with an initial contract of three years.
 October 8 – The Deutsches Symphonie-Orchester Berlin announces the appointment of Robin Ticciati as its next principal conductor, effective with the 2017–2018 season, with an initial contract of five years.
 October 13 – The Berlin Philharmonic Orchestra announces that Kirill Petrenko is formally to begin his tenure as its new chief conductor with the 2019–2020 season.
 October 14 – Opera Lyra Ottawa announces immediate cessation of operations, citing insufficient revenue and funding.
 October 23 – The Queensland Symphony Orchestra announces the appointment of Alondra de la Parra as its first-ever music director, effective in 2017, the first conductor ever to have the title of music director with an Australian orchestra, and the orchestra's first female conductor in a leadership post.
 November 5 – The Royal Philharmonic Society announces Martha Argerich as the 101st recipient of the Royal Philharmonic Society Gold Medal.
 November 9 – Opera Theatre of Saint Louis announces that music director Stephen Lord is to stand down from the post after the 2017 season, and to take the title of music director emeritus.
 November 11 – Orchestras Live announces the appointment of Sarah Derbyshire as its next chief executive.
 November 16 – The New Jersey Symphony Orchestra announces the appointment of Xian Zhang as its 14th music director, as of the 2016–2017 season, with an initial contract of four years.
 November 17 – Glyndebourne Festival Opera announces the appointment of Sebastian F. Schwarz as its next general director, effective in May 2016.
 November 18
 The Three Choirs Festival announces the appointment of Alexis Paterson as its new chief executive, effective in January 2016.
 The Staatsorchester Rheinische Philharmonie announces the appointment of Garry Walker as its next chief conductor, effective with the 2017–018 season.
 November 24 – The Grawemeyer Foundation announces Hans Abrahamsen as the winner of the 2016 Grawemeyer Award for Music Composition, for his song cycle let me tell you.
 December 1 – The BBC National Orchestra of Wales announces the appointment of Xian Zhang as its next principal guest conductor, the first female conductor ever named to a titled post with any BBC orchestra.
 December 2 – Birmingham Contemporary Music Group announces the appointment of Christoph Trestler as its new chair.
 December 3 – The Detroit Symphony Orchestra announces that Leonard Slatkin is to conclude his tenure as the orchestra's music director after the 2017–018 season, and subsequently to take the title of music director emeritus.
 December 5 – Nikolaus Harnoncourt announces via his website that he is retiring from conducting, the day before his 86th birthday, wi–h a handwritten note scanned to his website.  This note is reproduced in the concert programme of the Concentus Musicus Wien the next day at the Musikverein, Vienna, on the actual day of his 86th birthday.
 December 8 – The Royal Liverpool Philharmonic Orchestra announces Bethan Morgan-Williams as the winner of its first annual Christopher Brooks Composition Prize.
 December 9 – The Royal Opera House, Covent Garden announces that Kasper Holten is to leave the post of Director of Music in March 2017.
 December 16 – The Bulgarian National Radio Symphony Orchestra announces the appointment of Rossen Gergov as its next chief conductor, effective January 2016.
 December 22 – Anonymous 4 gives their final live concert performance at the Metropolitan Museum of Art in New York City before formally disbanding.
 December 29 – Myung-whun Chung submits his resignation as music director of the Seoul Philharmonic Orchestra.
 December 30 – Angela Hewitt is appointed a Companion of the Order of Canada.
 December 31
 New Year's Honours 2016
 Radu Lupu is made a Commander of the Order of the British Empire.
 Steuart Bedford, Leslie East, Malcolm Martineau and Helen Odell-Miller are each made an Officer of the Order of the British Empire.
 Catherine Arlidge, Alina Ibragimova, Michael McCarthy, and Michael Rafferty are each made a Member of the Order of the British Empire.
 Finchcocks Musical Museum in Goudhurst closes permanently.

New works
 John Adams
 Second Quartet
 Scheherazade.2 (symphony for violin and orchestra)
 John Luther Adams – Across the Distance
 Eleanor Alberga – Arise, Athena!
 Julian Anderson
 In lieblicher Bläue (Violin Concerto)
 Van Gogh Blue
 B Tommy Andersson – Pan
 Timo Andres – Strong Language (for string quartet) 
 Cathy Applegate – Piano Concertantrum (composed 2012–2013; premiered March 2015)
 Richard Ayres – No 48 (In the Night Studio)
 David Balasanyan
 Six Microludes, for piano
 Monument, for piano and tape
 Guy Barker – The Lanterne of Light
 Gerald Barry – The One-Armed Pianist
 Sally Beamish – "Be still" (Introit)
 Luke Bedford
 Instability
 Saxophone Quartet
 Fiona Bennett – The New Lady Radnor's Suite
 Judith Bingham
 Ghostly Grace
 Zodiack
 Harrison Birtwistle
 The Cure
 The Silk House Sequences
 Victoria Borisova-Ollas – ... and time is running past midnight ...
 Mark Bowden and Owen Sheers – A Violence of Gifts
 Luc Brewaeys – Sonnets to Sundry Notes
 Gary Carpenter – Dadaville
 Elliott Carter – The American Sublime
 Friedrich Cerha – Piccola Commèdia
 Unsuk Chin – Mannequin – Tableaux vivants for orchestra
 Pete Churchill – Echoes: A Song of Poland
 James Clapperton – Northern Sky
 Anna Clyne – The Seamstress
 Edward Cowie – Three Spitfire Motets
 Paul Crabtree – O Icarus
 Laurence Crane –  Chamber Symphony No 2 ("The Australian")
 Richard Danielpour – Of Love and Longing
 Tansy Davies – Re-greening
 Luis de Pablo:  Pensieri (Rhapsody for Flute and Orchestra)
 Bryce Dessner – Quilting
 Zosha Di Castri – Dear Life
 Richard Dünser – Entreacte
 Hugues Dufourt – Ombre portée
 Frédéric Durieux – Entscheiden
 Benjamin Dwyer: Nocturnal, after Benjamin Britten
 Jason Eckardt: Practical Alchemy
 Benjamin Ellin – Miyabi – Concerto for Violin and Orchestra
 Thierry Escaich – Concerto for Orchestra
 Mohammed Fairouz – Locales (composed 2014; premiered February 14, 2015)
 Ivan Fedele – Hommagesquisse
 David Fennessy – Hirta Rounds
 Lorenzo Ferrero
 Country Life, for saxophone and piano 
 A Night in Nashville, for saxophone and piano 
 Michael Finnissy – Janne
 Alan Fletcher
 Concerto for Oboe and Orchestra
 On a winter's night a traveler
 Cheryl Frances-Hoad – From the Beginning of the World
 Peter Fribbins – Violin Concerto
 Vivian Fung – Violin Concerto No 2 ('Of Snow and Ice')
 Michael Gandolfi – Ascending Light
 Philip Glass – Concerto for Two Pianos
 Alexander Goehr
 Variations (Homage to Haydn), for solo piano
 Seven Impromptus, Op. 96, for two pianos
 Iain Grandage – Dances with Devils (percussion concerto)
 Helen Grime – Concerto for clarinet and trumpet
 HK Gruber – into the open...
 Barry Guy – Mr Babbage is Coming to Dinner
 Georg Friedrich Haas
 "I can't breathe" (In memoriam Eric Garner)
 Saxophone Quartet
 Chris Paul Harman – Lieder und Arien
 Jennifer Higdon
 Civil Words
 Viola Concerto
 Robin Holloway
 Soldered Schumann
 Silvered Schubert
 Europa and the Bull (tuba concerto)
 James Horner – Collage: A Concerto for Four Horns and Orchestra
 Emily Howard – Afference
 James Newton Howard – Violin Concerto
 Philippe Hurel – Inserts
 Márton Illés – Re-akvarell (concerto for clarinet and orchestra)
 Marisol Jiménez: XLIII – MEMORIAM VIVIRE
 Betsy Jolas – Ravery Pour Pierre en ce jour
 Darryl Kubian – O for a Muse of Fire
 György Kurtág – Petite musique solennelle en hommage à Pierre Boulez 90
 Libby Larsen – The Birth Song Cycle
 James Ledger and Paul Kelly – War Music
 Joanna Lee: Hammer of Solitude
 Georges Lentz – Jerusalem (after Blake) (composed 2011–2014; premiered January 16, 2015)
 Mica Levi – Greezy
 Magnus Lindberg – Accused
 Tod Machover – Symphony in D
 Steven Mackey – Mnemosyne's Pool
 James MacMillan
 A Little Mass
 Symphony No 4
 Philippe Manoury – Chaconne
 Bruno Mantovani – B
 Colin Matthews and Michael Morpurgo – The Pied Piper of Hamelin
 David Matthews – Symphony No 8
 Melinda Maxwell – Fractures: Monk Unpacked
 Christopher Mayo – Supermarine
 Anna Meredith – Smatter Hauler
 Claudia Molitor – 2TwoLO
 Marc Monnet – 
 Nico Muhly
 Viola Concerto
 Mixed Messages
 Sentences
 Samy Moussa:  Crimson
 Dominic Muldowney – Smooth between Sea and Land
 Thea Musgrave – Power Play
 Marc Neikrug:
 Acequias for Guitar and String Quartet
 Canta-Concerto
 Andrew Norman
 Frank's House
 Switch (percussion concerto)
 Split (piano concerto)
 Enno Poppe – Zwölf
 André Previn – Nonet
 Torsten Rasch – A Welsh Night
 Wolfgang Rihm
 Violin Concerto No. 6 (Gedicht des Malers; composed in 2014, premiered in 2015)
 Über die Linie VIII
 Con Piano? Certo!
 Funde im Verscharrten
 Geste zu Vedova
 Gruss-Moment
 David Sawer – Coachman Chronos
 Albert Schnelzer – Tales from Suburbia
 Pascal Schumacher – Windfall Concerto (for vibraphone and orchestra)
 Elliott Sharp – Wannsee Noir
 Sean Shepherd:
 Concerto for Ensemble
 String Quartet No. 2
 Mark Simpson
 Israfel
 The Immortal (text by Melanie Challenger)
 Howard Skempton – The Rime of the Ancient Mariner
 Derrick Spiva – Prisms, Cycles, Leaps
 Johannes Maria Staud
 Moment, Leute, Moment!
 Segue II für Pierre Boulez
 Auf die Stimme der weißen Kreide (Specter I-III)
 Wasserzeichen (Auf die Stimme der weißen Kreide II)
 Tan Dun – The Wolf (concerto for double bass and orchestra; composed in 2014, premiered in 2015)
 Conrad Tao – An Adjustment
 Augusta Read Thomas – Of Being Is a Bird
 Shiori Usui: Ophiocordyceps unilateralis s.l.
 Errollyn Wallen – Rebuttal Blues No 1
 Bertram Wee – Dithyrambs
 Judith Weir – Good Morning, Midnight
 Lotta Wennäkoski – Päärme, for piano trio
 Michael F. Williams – Letters from the Front
 Michael Wolters – Requiem to Let
 Hugh Wood – Epithalamion
 Raymond Yiu – Symphony
 Nina C. Young – Agnosco Veteris

Opera
 Joby Talbot and Gene Scheer – Everest
 Mauricio Soleto and Andrés Ibáñez – El Público
 Ben Moore and Nahma Sandrow – Enemies, a Love Story
 Kevin Puts and Mark Campbell – The Manchurian Candidate
 Tansy Davies and Nick Drake – Between Worlds
 Matt Rogers and Sally O'Reilly – The Virtues of Things
 Per Bloland and Paul Schick – Pedr Solis
 Matthew Aucoin – Crossing
 Daniel Schnyder and Bridgette A. Wimberly – Charlie Parker's Yardbird
 Marco Tutino and Fabio Ceresa – La Ciociara (Two Women)
 Ricky Ian Gordon and William M. Hoffman – Morning Star
 Charlotte Bray and Amy Rosenthal – Entanglement
 Jeremy Howard Beck and Stephanie Fleischmann – The Long Walk
 Derrick Wang – Scalia/Ginsburg
 Gilda Lyons and Tammy Ryan – A New Kind of Fallout
 Jennifer Higdon and Gene Scheer – Cold Mountain
 Donnacha Dennehy and Enda Walsh – The Last Hotel
 Hans Gefors and Kerstin Perski – Notorious
 Gregory Spears and Royce Vavrek – O Columbia
 Philip Glass and Christopher Hampton – Appomattox (revised version)
 Georg Friedrich Haas and Jon Fosse – Morgen und Abend
 Jake Heggie and Terrence McNally – Great Scott
 Mark Adamo – Becoming Santa Claus
 Jimmy López and Nilo Cruz – Bel Canto
 Johanna Doderer – Fatima, oder von den mutigen Kindern

Albums
 Havergal Brian – The Tigers (first commercially issued recording, from 1983 BBC performance)
 Kaija Saariaho – Émilie Suite; Quatre Instants; Terra Memoria
 Ēriks Ešenvalds – "Northern Lights" (Hyperion)
 Rebecca Saunders, Fletch; Benedict Mason, Second String Quartet; Luke Bedford, Wonderful Four-Headed Nightingale; John Zorn, Pandora's Box – Arditti Quartet, Sarah Maria Sun (Col Legno)
 Johann Adolph Hasse – Siroe (first complete recording)
 Liza Lim – The Compass; Pearl, Ochre, Hair String; The Guest
 Kevin Volans – Trio Concerto; Piano Concerto; Symphony "Daar kom die Alibama"
 Mario Capuana, Bonaventura Rubino – Requiem Masses (Namur Chamber Choir)
 Agostino Steffani – Niobe, regina di Tebe
 Mario Castelnuovo-Tedesco – Violin Concerto No 2 (I Profeti), Concerto Italiano
 Nikolai Medtner – Piano Sonatas, 'Ein Idyll'
 Tabea Zimmermann (viola), Thomas Hoppe (piano) – Romance oubliée (Myrios Classics)
 Donnacha Dennehy – Crane; O; The Vandal; Hive
 Ricky Ian Gordon and Royce Vavrek – 27
 Marc Andre – ...auf...
 Félicien David – Le Désert
 Michael Gordon – Dystopia; Rewriting Beethoven's Seventh Symphony
 Tchaikovsky – Piano Concerto No. 1 (world premiere recording of 1879 version) / Prokofiev – Piano Concerto No. 2 (Myrios Classics)
 Hans Abrahamsen – Zählen und Erzählen
 Missy Mazzoli – Vespers for a New Dark Age
 Théodore Dubois – Musique Sacrée et Symphonique
 Wolfgang Rihm – Et Lux
 Judith Weir – Storm
 Krzysztof Penderecki – Magnificat, Kadisz
 Harrison Birtwistle – Angel Fighter, In Broken Images, Virelais
 Lotta Wennäkoski – Soie, Hava, Amor Omnia Suite
 Wartime Consolations : Shostakovich – Sonata for Violin and Piano (unfinished) / Mieczysław Weinberg – Rhapsody on Moldavian Themes (orchestral version) / Karl Amadeus Hartmann – Concerto funebre
 Roger Sacheverell Coke – Preludes and Variations
 Václav Tomášek – Songs
 Bob Chilcott – The Angry Planet
 Jörg Widmann – String Quartets
 John Adams – Absolute Jest, Grand Pianola Music
 Grażyna Bacewicz – String Quartets, Vol 1
 Christopher Simpson – Ayres
 Sadie Harrison – 'Solos and Duos for Piano and Strings'
 Boris Tischenko – Piano Sonatas Nos 7 and 8
 Brett Dean – String Quartets Nos 1 & 2; Five Epitaphs
 David Lang, Luciano Berio, Betty Olivero – Song of Songs
 Paul Hindemith – The Long Christmas Dinner
 Cheryl Frances-Hoad, Gordon Crosse, Piers Hellawell – Bach 2 the Future (Fenella Humphreys, violin)
 Wim Henderickx – Triptych
 Morton Feldman – For Bunita Marcus
 Jonathan Rathbone – Under the Shadow of His Wing
 Heinz Holliger – Machaut Transcriptions
 John Luther Adams – Ilimaq
 Charles Gounod – La Colombe
 Patricia Kopatchinskaja (violin) – Take Two (including music by Jorge Sanchez-Chiong et al)
 Toshio Hosokawa – Voyage VIII et al.
 Michael Nyman – War Work
 Robin de Raaff – Waiting for Miss Monroe
 Jürg Frey – Third String Quartet
 Joseph Kuridka – Beauty and Industry

Deaths
 January 2 – Bob Gilmore, British musicologist, 53
 January 6 – Lawrence Gushee, American musicologist, 83
 January 9 – Colin Sauer, British violinist, 90
 January 10 – Countess Yoko Nagae Ceschina, Japanese-born Italian aristocrat and patroness of classical music, 82
 January 12 – Elena Obraztsova, Russian operatic mezzo-soprano, 75
 January 13 – Frank Glazer, American pianist, 99
 January 19
Vera Gornostayeva, Russian pianist and piano teacher, 85
Ward Swingle, American singer, 87
 January 29 – Israel Yinon, Israeli conductor, 59
 February 1 – Aldo Ciccolini, Italian-born French pianist, 89
 February 3 – Andrew Patner, American music critic, 55
 February 9 – Marvin David Levy, American composer, 82
 February 13 – John McCabe, British composer and pianist, 75
 February 28 – Ezra Laderman, American composer, 90
 March 1 – Jennifer Ward Clarke, British cellist, 79
 March 19 – Peter Katin, British pianist, 84
 March 22 – Norman Scribner, American choral conductor, 79
 March 24 (killed in the crash of Germanwings Flight 9525):
Oleg Bryjak, Kazakh-born German opera singer, 54
Maria Radner, German opera singer, 33
 March 28 – Ronald Stevenson, British composer and pianist, 87
 March 29 – Ronald Knudsen, American orchestral violinist and conductor, 83
 April 2 – Dennis Marks, British radio & television producer and opera administrator, 66
 April 3 – Andrew Porter, British music critic, librettist, scholar and editor, 86
 April 5 – Claudio Prieto, Spanish composer, 80
 April 17 – Brian Couzens, British record producer and founder of Chandos Records, 82
 April 27 – Rolf Smedvig, American trumpeter, 62
 April 29
 Ronald Senator, British-born composer resident in the USA, 89
 Miriam Brickman, American pianist, 81
 May 2 – Clarice Carson, Canadian soprano, 85
 May 3 – Margaret Garwood, American composer, 88
 May 10
 Jack Body, New Zealand composer, 70
 Victor Salvi, American-born harpist and harp manufacturer, 95
 May 28 – Steven Gerber, American composer, 66
 May 29 – Peter Cropper, British violinist and leader of the Lindsay Quartet, 69
 May 31 – Nico Castel, American tenor, comprimario and vocal coach, 83
 June 2 – Günther Schneider-Siemssen, German opera stage designer, 88
 June 3 – Margaret Juntwait, American radio broadcaster and host of the Metropolitan Opera radio transmissions, 58
 June 12 – Ernest Tomlinson, British composer, 90
 June 13 – Ronald Wilford, American artist agency manager and executive, 87
 June 14 – Walter Weller, Austrian conductor and violinist, 75
 June 17 – Neil Courtney, American orchestral double bass player, 82
 June 21 – Gunther Schuller, American composer, conductor, teacher and author, 89
 June 22
 Joseph de Pasquale, American orchestral violist, 95
 John (Jack) McCaw, New Zealand-born British orchestral clarinetist, 96
 July 1 – Edward Greenfield, British music critic, 86
 July 7 – Friedemann Weigle, German violist and member of the Artemis Quartet, 52
 July 10 – Jon Vickers, Canadian tenor, 88
 July 15 – Alan Curtis, American harpsichordist, conductor and scholar, 80
 July 19 – David Roth, American opera administrator, 56
 July 21
 Paul Freeman, American conductor and founder of Chicago Sinfonietta, 79
 Vera Stern, American arts administrator and arts ambassador, 88
 July 26 – Vic Firth, American orchestral timpanist and percussionist, 85
 July 27 – Ivan Moravec, Czech pianist, 84
 August 2 – J. Durward Morsch, American composer, 94
 August 12 – John Scott, British-born organist and choirmaster resident in the USA, 59
 August 18 – Roger Smalley, British-born composer resident in Australia, 72
 August 22:
 Nikolaus Lehnhoff, Austrian opera director, 76
 Francis Dillnutt, British classical recording engineer, 91
 August 27 – George Cleve, Austrian-born American conductor, 79
 August 30 – Natalia Strelchenko (Strelle), Russian-born pianist, 38
 August 31 – Bruce Lawrence, American orchestral double bassist, 88
 September 5 – Jacques Israelievitch, French-born Canadian orchestral violinist, 67
 September 7
Susan Allen, American harpist, 64 (brain cancer)
Cor Edskes, Dutch organ builder and restorer, 90
 September 17 – Sir David Willcocks, British choirmaster, 95
 September 28 – Alexander Faris, Irish composer and conductor, 94
 October 1 – Dieter Kober, German conductor, 95
 October 5 – Reinhardt Elster, American opera orchestra harpist, 101
 October 13 – Duncan Druce, British musicologist, 76
 November 2 – Richard Horowitz, American opera orchestra timpanist and crafter of conductor batons, 91
 November 10 – Robert Craft, American classical music writer, conductor, and amanuensis to Igor Stravinsky, 92
 November 16 – Seymour Lipkin, American pianist and conductor, 88
 November 21 – Joseph Silverstein, American orchestra leader (concertmaster) and conductor, 83
 November 23 – Jouni Kaipainen, Finnish composer, 58
 November 28 – Luc Bondy, Swiss theatre and opera stage director, 67
 December 2 – John Eaton, US composer, 80
 December 4 – Rodney Milnes, British opera critic and translator, 79
 December 8 – Mattiwilda Dobbs, American opera singer and recitalist, 90
 December 15 – Stella Doufexis, German mezzo-soprano of Greek ancestry, 47
 December 16 – Aafje Heynis, Dutch soprano, 91
 December 18 – Luc Brewaeys, Belgian composer, 56
 December 19 – Kurt Masur, German conductor, 88
 December 22 – John Duffy, American composer and music administrator, 89

Major awards
 2015 Pulitzer Prize Winner in Music: Julia Wolfe – Anthracite Fields
 2015 Grawemeyer Award Winner in Music: Wolfgang Rihm – IN-SCHRIFT 2

Grammy Awards
 Best Orchestral Performance: John Adams – City Noir, Saxophone Concerto – St. Louis Symphony; David Robertson, conductor (Nonesuch)
 Best Opera Recording: Marc-Antoine Charpentier – La descente d'Orphée aux enfers; Boston Early Music Festival Chamber Ensemble and Vocal Ensemble; Paul O'Dette and Stephen Stubbs, conductors (CPO)
 Best Choral Performance: The Sacred Spirit of Russia – Conspirare; Craig Hella Johnson, conductor (harmonia mundi)
 Best Chamber Music/Small Ensemble Performance: In 27 Pieces: The Hilary Hahn Encores – Hilary Hahn and Cory Smythe (Deutsche Grammophon)
 Best Classical Instrumental Solo: Play – Jason Vieaux (Azica Records)
 Best Classical Solo Vocal Album: Douce France – Anne Sofie von Otter, Bengt Forsberg et al. (Naïve)
 Best Classical Compendium: Harry Partch – Plectra and Percussion Dances (Bridge Records)
 Best Contemporary Classical Composition: John Luther Adams – Become Ocean – Seattle Symphony Orchestra; Ludovic Morlot, conductor (Cantaloupe Music)

Juno Awards
Classical Albums of the Year:
 Solo or Chamber Ensemble: Béla Bartók – Chamber Works for Violin, Volume 3; James Ehnes et al. (Chandos)
 Large Ensemble or Soloist(s) with Large Ensemble Accompaniment: Wolfgang Amadeus Mozart – Piano Concertos Nos 22 & 24; Angela Hewitt, National Arts Centre Orchestra, Hannu Lintu (Hyperion)
 Vocal or Choral Performance: Franz Schubert – Winterreise; Gerald Finley, Julius Drake (Hyperion)
Classical Composition of the Year: Brian Current – Airline Icarus (Naxos)

Gramophone Classical Music Awards 2015
 Baroque Instrumental: JS Bach – Cello Suites; David Watkin, violoncello (Resonus)
 Baroque Vocal: Monteverdi – Vespri solenni per la festa di San Marco; Concerto Italiano, Rinaldo Alessandrini (Naïve)
 Chamber: Smetana – String Quartets Nos 1 & 2; Pavel Haas Quartet (Supraphon) 
 Choral: Elgar – The Dream of Gerontius/Sea Pictures; Sarah Connolly, Stuart Skelton, David Soar, BBC Symphony Orchestra and Chorus, Sir Andrew Davis (Chandos)
 Concerto: Beethoven – Piano Concertos Nos 3 & 4; Maria João Pires, Swedish Radio Symphony Orchestra, Daniel Harding (Onyx)
 Contemporary: Per Nørgård – Symphonies Nos 1 & 8; Vienna Philharmonic Orchestra, Sakari Oramo (Dacapo)
 Early Music: 'The Spy's Choirbook'; Alamire, English Cornett & Sackbut Ensemble, David Skinner (Obsidian)
 Instrumental: JS Bach – English Suites Nos 1, 3 & 5; Piotr Anderszewski (Warner Classics)
 Opera: Richard Strauss – Elektra; Evelyn Herlitzius, Waltraud Meier, Adrianne Pieczonka, Mikhail Petrenko, Tom Randle, Orchestre de Paris, Esa-Pekka Salonen; Stage director – Patrice Chéreau; Video director – Stéphane Metge (Bel Air Classique)
 Orchestral: Bruckner – Symphony No 9; Lucerne Festival Orchestra, Claudio Abbado (Deutsche Grammophon)
 Recital: 'A French Baroque Diva'; Carolyn Sampson, Ex Cathedra, Jeffrey Skidmore (Hyperion)
 Solo Vocal: Schubert – 'Nachtviolen'; Christian Gerhaher, Gerold Huber (Sony Classical)
 Recording of the Year: Bruckner – Symphony No 9; Lucerne Festival Orchestra, Claudio Abbado (Deutsche Grammophon)
 Young Artist of the Year: Joseph Moog
 Label of the Year: Channel Classics
 Artist of the Year: Paavo Järvi
 Lifetime Achievement Award: Bernard Haitink

British Composer Awards
 Amateur or Young Performers: Kate Whitley – Alive
 Choral: James Dillon – Stabat Mater dolorosa
 Community or Educational Project: Stuart Hancock – Snapshot Songs
 Contemporary Jazz Composition: Trish Clowes – The Fox, The Parakeet & The Chestnut
 Large Chamber: Sinan Savaskan – Many stares (through semi-nocturnal Zeiss-Blink) – Module 30
 Liturgical: Michael Finnissy – John the Baptist
 Orchestral: Harrison Birtwistle – Responses: Sweet disorder and the carefully careless
 Small Chamber: Julian Anderson – String Quartet No. 2
 Solo or Duo: Michael Finnissy – Beat Generation Ballads
 Sonic Art: Yann Seznec – Currents
 Stage Works: Julian Anderson – Thebans
 Wind Band or Brass Band: Rory Boyle – Muckle Flugga

References

Clssical
Classical music by year